The axolotl is a critically endangered neotenic salamander that is native to Lake Xochimilco and Lake Chalco in central Mexico.

Axolotl may also refer to:
 Axolotl Press, an American small press publisher that was acquired by Pulphouse Publishing in 1989
 Axolotl tanks, a fictional technology in the Dune universe created by Frank Herbert
 Double Ratchet Algorithm (formerly known as the Axolotl Ratchet), a cryptographic key management algorithm
 "Axolotl", a song by The Veils from the album Total Depravity
 the proper name of the star HD 224693
 "Axolotl", a short story by Julio Cortázar, published in his Final del juego collection
 The Old Axolotl, a digital only novel by Polish author Jacek Dukaj